Holy Spirit Cathedral or Cathedral of the Holy Spirit may refer to:
 Cathedral of the Holy Spirit, Istanbul, Turkey
 Cathedral of the Holy Spirit, Lugoj, Romania
 Cathedral of the Holy Spirit (Bismarck, North Dakota), United States
 Cathedral of the Holy Spirit, Hradec Králové, Czech Republic
 Cathedral of the Holy Spirit, Palmerston North, New Zealand
 Guildford Cathedral, England; "Cathedral Church of the Holy Spirit"
 Holy Spirit Cathedral (Accra), Ghana
 Holy Spirit Cathedral (Minsk), Belarus
 Holy Spirit Cathedral, Denpasar, Bali
 Holy Spirit Cathedral, Divinópolis, Brazil
 Holy Spirit Cathedral, Gbarnga, Liberia
 Holy Spirit Cathedral, Jataí, Brazil
 Holy Spirit Cathedral, Kpalimé, Togo
 Holy Spirit Cathedral, Penang, Malaysia
 Holy Spirit Cathedral, Quetzaltenango, Guatemala

See also
 Church of the Holy Spirit (disambiguation)